The Job Accommodation Network (JAN) is a service provided by the United States Department of Labor's Office of Disability Employment Policy (ODEP). JAN is one of several ODEP technical assistance centers. JAN facilitates the employment and retention of workers with disabilities by providing employers, employment providers, people with disabilities, their family members, and other interested parties with information on job accommodations, entrepreneurship, and related subjects. JAN's efforts are in support of the employment, including self-employment and small business ownership, of people with disabilities.

History
The network has been located on the campus of West Virginia University since its inception in 1983. It began with two consultants providing accommodation information over two telephone lines with no computers. At that time, JAN served only employers seeking accommodation information. Because of additional demand for its confidential, direct, and no-cost service, JAN quickly expanded beyond providing information to employers to include rehabilitation and educational professionals, individuals with disabilities, and anyone else interested in workplace accommodations.

Initially, JAN consulted primarily on sensory disabilities, those involving hearing, vision, touch, or speech impairments. Until the early 1990s, about 30 percent of JAN's requests addressed these disability areas. As computers, office machines, cell phones, wireless communication, and similar technology became common in workplaces, employees with all types of impairments needed to be able to use the technology. As caller questions became more technical, JAN consultants changed to a team approach, dividing into motor / mobility, sensory, and cognitive / neurological teams. A team approach allowed consultants to handle increasing case loads, yet stay current and knowledgeable about rapidly changing technology and products.

With the implementation of the Americans with Disabilities Act of 1990 (ADA) in 1992, more individuals began calling JAN and more cases focused on accommodating individuals with motor / mobility impairments. Prior to 1992, JAN averaged 630 accommodation inquiries per month. In 1992, cases soared to over 1,600 per month and continued to steadily rise throughout the 1990s, ending with an average of almost 3,000 per month. JAN now averages 53,000+ inquiries and 5,000,000 Website customers annually.

In 2000, the JAN staff was evaluated by WESTAT, an employee-owned research corporation serving agencies of the U.S. Government, as well as businesses, foundations, and state and local governments. JAN achieved recognition for achieving the highest score ever awarded by an outside evaluator.

Services Provided
JAN's consultants, each with at least a master's degree in a specialized field, provide information on accommodations for all types of impairments, including sensory, motor, cognitive, and psychiatric conditions. Information is also available about rights and responsibilities under the Americans with Disabilities Act and related legislation. JAN continues to provide resources for veterans and returning wounded and injured military, including support for America's Heroes at Work.

JAN also offers information about entrepreneurship for people with disabilities. JAN consultants handle each inquiry on a case-by-case basis offering self-employment and small business development expertise and referrals regarding business planning, financing strategies, marketing research, disability-specific programs, income supports and benefits planning, e-commerce, independent contracting, home-based business options, and small business initiatives for disabled veterans. JAN customers can expect to receive a resource packet tailored to their specific entrepreneurial goals with consultants available throughout all stages of the process who can provide ongoing supports.

This technical assistance is provided in English and Spanish and is free of charge via telephone, email, chat, and postal mail. All communications are confidential and available to employers, medical, and rehabilitation professionals, people with disabilities as well as anyone else who is interested in workplace accommodations.

JAN consultants also provide information through other media. JAN produces monthly webcasts on various subjects on concerns related to disabilities or limitations in the workplace. Consultants frequently present at various conferences. Interested parties can also submit requests for local, distant, and remote training events.

Partnerships and Collaborations
JAN supports private employers by providing JAN's customized Webcasts, Second Life training, online application systems and Website accessibility assessments, and other technical assistance materials designed specifically for their industries' workforce.

JAN has either a partnership or collaboration with the: 
United States Business Leadership Network (USBLN) for its annual conference, Best Employer Practices Quarterly Webcasts, and monthly newsletter, among other projects. JAN provides a quarterly submission to USBLN newsletter. JAN also provides technical assistance to the Campaign for Disability Employment of which the USBLN is a collaborator. In addition, JAN provides considerable customized training for state BLN Chapters throughout the country.
Assistive Technology Industry Association (ATIA) in the execution of its annual Employer's Forum.
EconSys and the Assistive Technology Collaboration as they develop a series of effective workplace practices for integrating assistive technology into the workplace for people with disabilities.
Computer/Electronic Accommodations Program on projects such as the Perspectives on Employment of People with Disabilities Conference, JAN's Federal Employer Winter Webcast Series, and CAPTEC Pentagon Innovation Days. JAN staff co-presents with CAP staff at Federal events and national conferences. In addition, JAN provided several hours of accommodation and ADAAA training for the EEOC/DoD Disability Program Manager Training and Certification Pilot Training Course.
Equal Employment Opportunity Commission (EEOC) on efforts such as the design of LEAD Program Schedule A materials, dissemination of ADA-related guidance materials, collaboration for JAN's Federal Employer Winter Webcast Series, and presentations at the EEOC's Excel Conference. In addition, JAN provided several hours of accommodation and ADAAA training for the EEOC/DoD Disability Program Manager Training and Certification Pilot Training Course.
Members of the National Industry Liaison Group by providing assessments of its online application system and general Websites for accessibility using the ODEP funded Accessible Systems Racing League tool.
USDA TARGET Center to provide an assistive technology (AT) room where employers and others can test AT. This occurred previously at the JAN Conferences and in 2009 at the USBLN Conference. JAN staff members visited the TARGET Center while in Washington, DC to review the latest assistive technologies, and JAN continues to explore future Web links to TARGET Center resources and from TARGET's Website to JAN resources. JAN has engaged the TARGET Center in the development of its Federal Employer Winter Webcast Series to promote the hiring of people with disabilities in the Federal government.
Gettinghired.com with a relatively new collaboration. JAN is now on the Advisory Council and has developed reciprocal links from respective Websites. In addition, JAN has a training scheduled for JAN staff to learn more about Gettinghired.com's resources for individuals with disabilities who are looking for work. This will streamline JAN's referrals to individuals who may contact JAN while looking for work. Gettinghired.com's job board also presents JAN with one more resource for recruiting new employees.
ODEP's America's Heroes At Work (AHAW) to develop JAN reference materials on the Website prior to the August 2008 launch. JAN provided consultation on accommodation issues to AHAW staff, including ODEP's subcontractor. JAN developed a Veterans Blog on the JAN Website for use by AHAW and other veterans' programs.
Regional Disability and Business Technical Assistance Centers (DBTACs) through numerous Webcasts, podcasts, and other events. In addition, JAN presents on accommodations and the employment provisions of the ADA at the DBTAC national conference and both groups cross-refer when appropriate. Historically, JAN also involved the local regional DBTAC in the annual JAN Conference. JAN continues this tradition by working with the USBLN to include a DBTAC in its annual conference.
American Association of People with Disabilities (AAPD) as JAN and AAPD reviewed each respective Website to insure the inclusion of links and information about each organization. In addition, JAN was a co-sponsor of this year's AAPD Disability Mentoring Day in Duluth, MN.
National Multiple Sclerosis Society as JAN conducts several trainings per year that engage the employment support personnel of the National MS Society on a state and national level. JAN has involved the National MS Society in conferences and monthly Webcasts. In addition, JAN has reviewed documents targeting employers that relate to developing policies under the ADA.
National Association of ADA Coordinators by hosting the NAADAC Website.
National Association of State Workforce Agencies (NASWA) in collaboration with DOL partners, including ODEP's America's Heroes at Work project, JAN provided training at the DOL EEOC Forum as well as at the national NASWA Conference. JAN also gave a teleconference presentation on "ADA Update" for the Equal Opportunity Committee meeting of NASWA.
Other employer groups such as the Society for Human Resource Management, the Disability Management Employers Coalition, the American Bar Association, and the National Industry Liaison Group to provide training for members as well as disseminate information.
Virtual-based Second Life groups such as Virtual Ability, Virtual Helping Hands (including Helen Keller Day in Second Life), TechSoup, and the Second Life Bar Association to provide training, technical assistance, and virtual referrals.

References

External links
Job Accommodation Network Official Site
U.S. Department of Labor's Office of Disability Employment Policy
U.S. Department of Labor

Accessibility
Disability accommodations
Disability in the United States